The 2020–21 Saint Joseph's Hawks basketball team represented Saint Joseph's University during the 2020–21 NCAA Division I men's basketball season. The Hawks, led by second-year head coach Billy Lange, played their home games at Hagan Arena in Philadelphia, Pennsylvania as members of the Atlantic 10 Conference. They finished the season 5-15, 3-9 in A-10 Play to finish in 13th place. They defeated La Salle in the first round of the A-10 tournament before losing in the second round to UMass.

Previous season
The previous season was the first season without longtime head coach, Phil Martelli since 1994. The Hawks finished the 2018–19 season 6–26 overall, 2–16 in A-10 play to finish in a tie for 13th place. As the No. 13 seed in the A-10 tournament, they played against the No. 12 seed, George Mason in the opening round, where they lost 70–77. Their season record-wise, was their poorest since the 1974–75 season.

Offseason

Departures

Transfers

2020 recruiting class

2021 recruiting class

Preseason

A10 media poll
The Atlantic 10 men's basketball media poll was released on November 9, 2020. Saint Joseph's was picked to finish 12th.

Roster

Schedule

|-
!colspan=12 style=| Regular season
|-

|-
!colspan=12 style=| A-10 tournament

References

External links 
 Saint Joseph's Basketball on ESPN

Saint Joseph's Hawks men's basketball seasons
Saint Joseph's
Saint Joseph's
Saint Joseph's